Critical variables are defined, for example in thermodynamics, in terms of the values of variables at the critical point. 

On a PV diagram, the critical point is an inflection point. Thus: 

For the van der Waals equation, the above yields: 

Thermodynamic properties
Conformal field theory